The site of  in Hakodate, Hokkaidō, Japan, is that once occupied by the Shinori Fort or Fortified Residence (as denoted by the tate or date ending). This was the easternmost of the so-called "Twelve Garrisons of Southern Hokkaido", built on the Oshima Peninsula by the Wajin from the fourteenth century. The site was designated a National Historic Site in 1934 and is one of the Japan Castle Foundation's Continued Top 100 Japanese Castles.

Shinori fort

A short distance inland from Shinori Fishing Port, with the mouth of the Shinori River to the west, the gently sloping site overlooks the Tsugaru Strait and Shimokita Peninsula, with views also towards Mount Hakodate.

The Hakodate City Board of Education conducted excavations and surveys of the enclosure and surrounding area between 1983 and 1985, uncovering the remains of a number of buildings, palisades, a well, artefacts made of bronze, iron, stone, and wood, celadons and white porcelain from southern China, as well as domestic Suzu, Echizen, and Seto ware.

Three different intercolumnar measurements were used in the construction of the buildings, the style of the well is that found in Heian-kyō in the late Kamakura period, while many of the ceramics are typical of the early fifteenth century.

Accordingly, three main phases have been identified: the end of the fourteenth or early-fifteenth century; mid-fifteenth century; and sixteenth century or later. With the archaeological evidence pushing back the origins of the fort at least half a century before Koshamain, its construction can no longer be understood as an immediate response to the contingencies of 1457, and other explanations are required.

Shinori hoard

This is the largest hoard found to date in Japan in terms of the number of coins it contains.

The three large vessels excavated weighed, together with their contents, . Ninety-three different types of coin have been identified: a handful in total of early Japanese coinage of the Asuka, Nara and early Heian periods, late tenth-century Vietnamese coinage of the Đinh and Early Lê dynasties, and late eleventh-century Goryeo coinage from Korea; the bulk comprising Chinese coinage, primarily of the Song dynasty, issues ranging in date from 4 Zhu Ban Liang minted in the fifth year of Emperor Wen of Han (175 BC) to Hongwu Tongbao from the first year of the Hongwu Emperor, founder of the Ming dynasty (1368). The 374,435 coins from this hoard now at the Hakodate City Museum have been designated an Important Cultural Property.

A 1999 study of 275 Japanese hoards, totalling 3,530,000 coins, found that the Chinese copper coins used in Japan in the Middle Ages were brought over in the largest number in the thirteenth century, were used primarily in commerce or for paying soldiers, and were buried largely for reasons of security, although there were also instances of ritual or votive deposits. The dating of the Shinori hoard precludes its burial as a response to Koshamain's War; instead it may relate to trade, the local Shinori or Kaga kombu featuring alongside Ezo salmon in the Nanboku-chō period text . Produce from the area would have been traded along the Hokuriku coast to reach the markets of Kyōto and Ōsaka.

See also
 List of Historic Sites of Japan (Hokkaidō)
 List of Cultural Properties of Japan - archaeological materials (Hokkaidō)
 Hakodate City Museum
 Shiryōkaku
 Shakushain's revolt
 Chashi
 Kitamaebune
 National Ainu Museum

Notes

References

External links

Shinoridate 

History of Hokkaido
Hakodate
Historic Sites of Japan
Archaeological sites in Japan
Castles in Hokkaido
1968 archaeological discoveries